Commercial International Bank or CIB is an Egyptian bank, one of the largest banks in the Egyptian private sector, working to provide a wide and distinguished range of banking products and services to its clients, including individuals, wealthy owners, institutions and companies of all kinds. Expert in the financial market and investment. The Commercial International Bank is one of top 100 Companies in the Middle East 2021, providing them with the best financial solutions. The bank has maintained its existence as the most profitable commercial bank in Egypt for more than 35 years, thanks to its management that adopts the highest standards of transparency and governance in addition to the distinguished training programs provided to its employees, and the number of its employees is about 6000.

History
The Commercial International Bank was established in 1975, with joint ownership by National Bank of Egypt (51%) and Chase Manhattan Bank (49%) under the name "Chase National Bank of Egypt". In 1987, after Chase Bank’s decision to sell its share of the shares, the National Bank of Egypt established Increasing its stake to 99.9%, and the bank’s name was changed to "Commercial International Bank – Egypt." The National Bank of Egypt's share continued to decline through several public offerings, to reach 18.7%. In 2006, a consortium led by Ripplewood Holdings acquired the share of the National Bank of Egypt. In July 2009, Actis purchased a 9.1% stake in Commercial International Bank, thus becoming the largest single shareholder in the bank's capital.

In March 2014, Actis sold part of its stake in the bank amounting to 2.6%. The sale was made through the Egyptian Stock Exchange to a group of several portfolio managers and international investment funds. In May of the same year, Actis sold its remaining 6.5% stake in the bank's capital to Fairfax Holding Company for Financial Services, and in late 2015 the Commercial International Bank acquired the shares of Citibank – Egypt through the Egyptian Stock Exchange and included all of its branches in its management. in April 2022 ADQ Holding — one of Abu Dhabi's sovereign funds acquired a stake in the bank worth $911.457m.

See also
 List of banks in Egypt

References

Egyptian brands
Banks of Egypt
Egyptian companies established in 1975
Companies listed on the Egyptian Exchange